Rocksberg is a rural locality in the Moreton Bay Region, Queensland, Australia.

Geography
The Caboolture River flows from north to east through the locality with Zillmans Crossing being a former ford (now a low-level bridge) across the river. The ford was part of the Old North Road (now superseded by the Bruce Highway)  and was named after Leopold Zillman, an early pioneer farmer in the area. The river flats (elevation about 50 metres above sea level) are used for agriculture, mostly grazing, but the western side of the locality is undeveloped mountain land rising to numerous unnamed peaks, the highest being 350 metres above sea level.

There is a picnic reserve near Zillmans Crossing.

History
The locality takes its name from the property name used by the Zillman family. In the early 1840s, the Archer brothers of Durundur Station and Evan Mackenzie of Kilcoy Station blazed a trail to connect their farms with Brisbane, creating Old North Road (as it now known) as the first road north from Brisbane. Later it was supplanted by a road closer to the coast (now known as Old Gympie Road) and subsequently by the Bruce Highway even closer to the coast.

Rocksberg Provisional School opened on 19 June 1893, becoming Rocksberg State School on 1 January 1909. It closed in 1954. It was located at approx 5 W James Road.

The median age of the Rocksberg population was 43 years, 6 years above the Australian median. 76.6% of people living in Rocksberg were born in Australia. The other top responses for country of birth were England 4.7%, New Zealand 2.7%, South Africa 2.3%, Indonesia 1%, Netherlands 1%. 88% of people spoke only English at home; the next most common languages were 1% Dutch, 1% German, 1% Indonesian, 0% Irish, 0% Gaelic (Scotland).

Education 
There are no schools in Rocksberg. The nearest government primary schools are Bellmere State School in neighbouring Bellmere to the north-east, Minimbah State School in Morayfield to the east, and Dayboro State School in Dayboro to the south. The nearest government secondary schools are Tullawong State High School in Caboolture to the north-east, Morayfield State High School in Morayfield to the east, and Bray Park State High School in Bray Park to the south-east.

Attractions 
Rocksberg Park Heritage Reserve is a recreational area  on McNamara Road alongside the Caboolture River. It has information about early pioneers of the district. It is part of the Caboolture Heritage Drive.

References

Suburbs of Moreton Bay Region
Localities in Queensland